Tony Ramey is an Americana and Country Music singer and songwriter. During his career, he has recorded eleven albums and EPs and had dozens of songs recorded by other country music artists. His repertoire of songs reaches over 3,400 in number and his songwriting career spans twenty-four years as a professional.  Ramey wrote and performed the title song for the movie, The Last Ride a fact-based drama about the final days of troubled country-music legend Hank Williams. His music can also be heard on the soundtrack for Pure Country 2: The Gift. He has performed a duet with Willie Nelson on his Soul Survivor album, which brought some acclaim to his status as a troubadour. His songs have appeared in television as well on daytime drama series “The Young and the Restless” and on outdoor television shows such as “Canada in the Rough”.

Early life 

(Tony) Anthony Ramey was born on April 17, 1974 in Kenova, West Virginia. He grew up in Kenova where his father was a journeyman for Owens-Illinois Glass Company and his mother was a law department assistant. Tony has one older brother, Aca Ramey, a federal park ranger in Huntington, WV for the U.S. Army Corps of Engineers.

Tony began earning royalties from his songs when he was only seventeen years old—garnering song credits on Nashville independent artists and acts working out of Branson Missouri.

After graduating from Ceredo-Kenova High School, Tony earned bachelor’s and master’s degrees in English Literature at Marshall University.  While in college, Tony formed the Dixie Flyer Band, a country music cover band who also played Tony's original songs he had begun writing at the age of 11. After winning the True-Value Country Showdown, Dixie Flyer toured extensively throughout Ohio, Kentucky, Virginia, and West Virginia, performing at fairs, festivals, and other music venues.  Tony moved to Nashville and later worked on a PhD in English Literature with Concentrations in Old English, Romanticism, and American Literature.  His scholarship and work in Samuel Taylor Coleridge garnered a Wolfe Award from MTSU's graduate school for excellence in critical writing and research.

Music career

Ramey's frequent performances included opening for Billy Ray Cyrus, Dan Seals, Reba McEntire, Lorrie Morgan, George Jones, Keith Whitley, Glen Campbell, and other Country Music artists.

Ramey was offered a deal on Polydor Polygram/Mercury Records, but shortly thereafter the Polygram division was bought by A&M of California and the Nashville office was closed.  Ramey began working with Tom Collins, a producer and publisher on Nashville's Music Row.  Ramey's first gold record as a songwriter, "I Don't Want This Song to End, was recorded by John Michael Montgomery.

Several years later, Tony and Tom Collins amicably parted ways. Not long after, Ramey was invited to do a songwriting round at the Bluebird Café. While performing at Bluebird, Ramey was seen by the creative director of Muy Bueno Music, owned by country music artist George Strait.  While at Muy Bueno, Ramey amassed a catalog of more than 900 songs and several country Top Forty, international Top Forty, and gold record and platinum record hits.

In 2007, Tony left Muy Bueno to sign with Cherry Lane Music of New York, which began by publishing songs from the iconic John Denver and Elvis Presley.  Ramey's songs were performed on television and in film, and by Canadian, Australian, and European musicians.  While at Cherry Lane, Ramey produced and released his self-titled fifth studio album.

When BMG Germany acquired Cherry Lane in 2010, Ramey joined Davis Music Group in Nashville as creative director/songwriter for the company's publishing division.  His stint there would only last a year and the road would call him out again to begin touring as a troubadour.

In the spring of 2011, Tony moved to Greenville, Texas where he is continuing to write music, and has undertaken a concert tour throughout the US.  After moving to Texas, he recorded CDs Throwback, Soul Survivor (which features Willie Nelson), and The Spirit of Hank and the Heart of James Dean.  He is the recipient of the Country Music Association of Texas Independent Artist of the Year Award in 2016.  In 2015, Country Music icon Ray Price recorded a song Tony co-wrote called "No More Songs to Sing" for his Beauty Is:  The Last Sessions Album.  Most recently (2015-16), Mark Chesnutt recorded Tony Ramey's song "Oughta Miss Me By Now" and Marcus Lindsey of The Marcus Lindsey Band recorded "Too Much Ain't Enough" in 2015 for his self-titled debut album Marcus Lindsey.  His song credits on current releases include the 2018 Spotify and Texas Country Radio hit "Any Night in Texas," the title song from Jon Wolfe's 2018 album release, and "A Country Boy's Life Well Lived from the same collection."

Career and awards 

Gold records

I Don’t Want This Song To End by John Michael Montgomery (Album: Leave A Mark)
Second Chance by Trisha Yearwood (Album: Inside Out)
Hot Grease and Zydeco by George Strait (Album: Twang)
Something To Write Home About by Craig Morgan (Album: Craig Morgan)

Awards 
“American Idol Underground” - Winner, Country music genre (March 2006)
"Country Music Association of Texas" - Winner, Independent Artist of the Year Award (2016)
"Broadcast Music Incorporated" - Winner, BMI Award for "Make Up in Love" as one of the most played songs of 2000.

Songwriter's credits

Discography 

Tony Ramey and the Dixie Flyer Band (Copper Creek Records, 1994)
True Calling (Copper’s Creek Records, 1997)
Places (Music Mill/Copper Creek Records, 2004)
Tony Ramey (Airastar/Copper Creek Records, 2006)
Is It Worth My Broken Heart (EverSong Records, 2008)
Once Again (Dig It Deep Records, 2010)
Throwback (Dig It Deep Records, 2012)
Soul Survivor (Dig It Deep Records, 2014)
Spirit of Hank and the Heart of James Dean (Rhyme Heart Records, 2016)
I've Aways Had a Song (Rhyme Heart Records, 2019)

Re-mastered Releases

 Places (Rhyme Heart Records 2018)
 Soul Survivor (Rhyme Heart Records 2018)

Singles

 "Into the Sun (Rhyme Heart Records 2018)

References 

 Music Review: George Strait- Twang [MCA Nashville] | Twang Nation - The Best In Americana Music
 News Archive | RoughStock
 News Archive | RoughStock
 Tony Ramey at Dallas Songwriters Association : Scene in Town
 Texas Singer/Songwriter Tony Ramey On KTEN News Midday - Vancouver Star

External links

 http://www.thelastridefile.com/
 http://www.countrymusicassociationoftexas.com

1970 births
Living people
American country singer-songwriters
21st-century American singers
People from Kenova, West Virginia
Country musicians from West Virginia
Singer-songwriters from West Virginia